HD 195019 (HIP 100970, SAO 106138) is a star system in the constellation of Delphinus. HD 195019 A is a yellow dwarf or subgiant [G3IV-V]. Star HD 195019 B, detected by spectrometry,  was initially believed to be a smaller and dimmer orange dwarf of the K3 type, although later (2003) research failed to detect any stellar companion.

Planetary system
In 1998, a planet was discovered at Lick Observatory utilizing a radial velocity method, orbiting around Star HD 195019 A.

See also
 HD 190228
 HD 196050
 List of extrasolar planets

References

External links

Binary stars
G-type main-sequence stars
G-type subgiants
195019
100970
Delphinus (constellation)
Planetary systems with one confirmed planet
Durchmusterung objects
J20281860+1846103